Radio Uno was a radio station located at 97.1 MHz on the FM dial in Santiago de Chile. It is also transmitted via the internet in the rest of the country and the world.

Began broadcasting on April 18, 2008 in the 97.1 MHz frequency formerly occupied by Radio Activa, which moved to 92.5 MHz

According to sources of the radio group, Ibero American Radio Chile, the idea is to give space to all types of category Chilean music from Lucho Gatica, Buddy Richard and Violeta Parra, to more recent names such as Alamedas, Teleradio Donoso, Los Bunkers, Fahrenheit, De Saloon, Juana Fe, Chico Trujillo, Américo and Francisca Valenzuela, for example.

Finally it is confirmed that the signal of Radio Uno cease to exist on February 25, 2016 at 00:00 hours.

Past programs 
La Picá de UNO (UNO's Pica)
Los Guardianes de la Parilla (The Keepers of the Grill)
Escudo Nacional (Coat of Arms)
Haciendo Patria (Patria making)
El bailongo de la Uno (Dance hall's Uno)
Welcome TV (parody of Bienvenidos)
Tolerancia Suero (parody of Tolerancia Cero)

Former staff
Lucho Hernández Heríquez
Ramón Llao
Pato Bauerle
Berni Traub
Sergio Cancino

References

External links 
Radio Uno
Listen Live
Ibero Americana Radio Chile
PRISA

Radio stations in Chile
Mass media in Santiago
Radio stations established in 2008
Radio stations disestablished in 2016
2008 establishments in Chile
2016 disestablishments in Chile
Defunct mass media in Chile